Jean-Baptiste Le Bescond (born 9 June 1980 in Pabu) is a French professional football player. Currently, he plays in the Championnat National for Paris FC.

He played on the professional level in Ligue 1 for En Avant de Guingamp.

1980 births
Living people
French footballers
Ligue 2 players
En Avant Guingamp players
AS Moulins players
FC Gueugnon players
Paris FC players
Vannes OC players
Association football midfielders
Sportspeople from Côtes-d'Armor
Footballers from Brittany